Folly is a historic plantation house located near Staunton, Augusta County, Virginia. The house was built about 1818, and is a one-story, brick structure with a long, low service wing and deck-on-hip roof in the Jeffersonian style. It has an original rear ell fronted by a Tuscan order colonnade. The front facade features a tetrastyle pedimented portico with stuccoed Tuscan columns and a simple lunette in the pediment. A similar portico is on the north side and a third portico was replaced by a wing added in 1856. The house closely resembles Edgemont near Covesville, Virginia. Also on the property are contributing original brick serpentine walls, a spring house, smokehouse and icehouse.

It was listed on the National Register of Historic Places in 1973.

References

External links

Folly Farm, Folly Mills Creek, Staunton, Staunton, VA including 7 photos, 10 measured drawings, and 4 data pages at the Historic American Buildings Survey (HABS)

Historic American Buildings Survey in Virginia
Plantation houses in Virginia
Houses on the National Register of Historic Places in Virginia
Palladian Revival architecture in Virginia
Houses completed in 1818
Houses in Augusta County, Virginia
National Register of Historic Places in Augusta County, Virginia
1818 establishments in Virginia